Route 221 is a  east–west highway in eastern Missouri. Its western terminus is at Route 21 near Pilot Knob. Its eastern terminus is at U.S. Route 67 (US 67) near Farmington.

Major intersections

References

221